Vaciseva Tavaga (born 16 November 1973) is a Fijian sprinter. She competed in the women's 100 metres at the 1992 Summer Olympics.

References

1973 births
Living people
Athletes (track and field) at the 1992 Summer Olympics
Fijian female sprinters
Olympic athletes of Fiji
Athletes (track and field) at the 2002 Commonwealth Games
Commonwealth Games competitors for Fiji
World Athletics Championships athletes for Fiji
Place of birth missing (living people)
Olympic female sprinters